PV Telescopii, also known as HD 168476, is a variable star in the southern constellation of Telescopium. It is too dim to be visible to the naked eye, having an apparent visual magnitude that has been measured varying from 9.24 down to 9.40. The star is the prototype of a class of objects called PV Telescopii variables.

This is an extreme helium star that shows a highly-processed atmosphere. It is a blue-white hued B-type supergiant star with a peculiar spectrum that has "weak hydrogen lines and enhanced lines of He and C". This object may be a late thermal pulse post-AGB star or the result of a merger of two white dwarf stars. The star shows radial velocity changes thought to be due to radial pulsations caused by a strange mode instability. It shows variations over a few days, 8–10 days being typically quoted. Despite a mass thought to be less than the sun, it is actually around 24,000 more luminous.

References

B-type supergiants
PV Telescopii variables

Telescopium (constellation)
Durchmusterung objects
168476
090099
Telescopii, PV